The Vulture's Eye is a 2004 horror film directed by Frank Sciurba and starring Anne Flosnik, Fred Iacovo, Jason King, James Nalitz, Brooke Paller, and Joseph Reo. Inspired by Bram Stoker's novel Dracula, it is set in Virginia.

Premise
A young woman, Lucy, in falls from her horse while on a ride in the Virginia countryside and is rescued by her new neighbor, the foreign Count Klaus Vogul. The Count becomes obsessed by the sultry Lucy and all of her friends.

References

External links
 
 

American vampire films
Dracula films
2004 horror films
2004 films
2000s English-language films
2000s American films